Kapurpur may refer to:
 Kapurpur, Pakistan, a settlement in Punjab, Pakistan
 Kapurpur, Jaunpur, a village in Uttar Pradesh, India
 Kapurpur, Raebareli, a village in Uttar Pradesh, India